Wykno may refer to the following places:
Wykno, Piotrków County in Łódź Voivodeship (central Poland)
Wykno, Gmina Będków in Łódź Voivodeship (central Poland)
Wykno, Gmina Ujazd in Łódź Voivodeship (central Poland)
Idźki-Wykno, a village in Wysokie Mazowieckie County, Podlaskie Voivodeship (eastern Poland)
Stare Wykno, a village in Wysokie Mazowieckie County, Podlaskie Voivodeship (eastern Poland)
Nowe Wykno, a village in Wysokie Mazowieckie County, Podlaskie Voivodeship (eastern Poland)
Gromadzyn-Wykno, a village in Kolno County, Podlaskie Voivodeship (eastern Poland)